Yugoslavia in War 1941–1945 is a Radio Television of Serbia (RTS) documentary series first broadcast in the early 1990s. The documentary includes participants and eyewitnesses from the war, as well as notable Yugoslav, British, German, Russian and Italian historians, publicists and journalists. The documentary attempts to provide multiple viewpoints for significant events of that time period.

Episodes

Contributors

Direct participants and eyewitnesses

Members of Yugoslav government and Yugoslav Royal Army 
 Prince Alexander of Yugoslavia
 Prince Tomislav of Yugoslavia
 Nikola Kosić, a mayor of YRA
 Svetozar Lolić

Partisans 
 Milovan Đilas
 Vladimir Velebit
 Svetozar Vukmanović Tempo
 Vlado Dapčević
 Milutin Morača
 Nikola Ilić
 Milan Basta
 Mihailo Švabić
 Mirko Stanojković
 Mihajlo Đurđević
 Aleksandar Stevanović
 Zoran Milentijević
 Jože Žukovec
 Ante Klarić
 Vera Sarić
 Aleksandar Krunić
 Mihailo Marković

Chetniks 
 Miomir Kolarević
 Branko Mihailović, son of Dragoljub Mihailović
 Radoban Dubak, a flag bearer of Pavle Đurišić
 Vladan Radosavljević, son of a Chetnik commander

Others 
 Claus Vogell, a captain of Wehrmacht
 Julian Amery
 Peter Kemp
 Ljuban Jednak, the sole survivor of Glina massacre

Historians, publicists and journalists

Yugoslavs 
 Branko Petranović (also a partisan during the war)
 Mile Bjelajac
 Čedomir Popov
 Bogdan Krizman
 Dušan Bilandžić (also a partisan during the war)
 Aleksandar Kasaš
 Radmila Radić
 Savo Skoko (also a partisan during the war)
 Enver Redžić (also a partisan during the war)
 Stevan K. Pavlowitch
 Milan Koljanin
 Radmila Radić
 Čedomir Janić
 Feliks Pašić
 Jaša Almuli
 Smilja Avramov
 Milan Ristović
 Rasim Hurem
 Dragan Ćirić
 Dragoljub Živojinović
 Gojko Miljanić
 Dragoljub Mirčetić (also a partisan during the war)

Foreign 
 Holm Sundhaussen
 Manfred Messerschmidt
 Karl-Heinz Schlarp
 Basil Davidson
 Michael McConville
 Igor Buharkin
 Leonid Gibiansky
 Francesco Privitera

References 

Television series about Yugoslavia
Documentary television series about World War II
Radio Television of Serbia original programming
Television shows set in Serbia
Television shows set in Belgrade